Sir Pierre-Amand Landry,  (May 1, 1846 – July 28, 1916) was an Acadian lawyer, judge and political figure in New Brunswick. He represented Westmorland County in the Legislative Assembly of New Brunswick from 1870 to 1874 and from 1878 to 1883. He represented Kent in the House of Commons of Canada from 1883 to 1890 as a Conservative member.

Early life and education
He was born in Memramcook, New Brunswick, the son of Amand Landry and Pélagie Caissie, and was educated in Memramcook and Fredericton. He taught school for a time, articled in the law office of Albert James Smith and was called to the bar in 1871, becoming the first Acadian lawyer in the province.

Legal career
Landry set up practice in Dorchester. In 1872, he married Bridget Annie McCarthy. In 1875, he helped defend nine Acadians charged with killing an English protester at a demonstration by Acadians against a public school tax. Landry served in the province's Executive Council as Commissioner of Public Works from 1878 to 1882 and provincial secretary from 1882 to 1883. As Commissioner of Public Works, he was responsible for the construction of a new provincial building for the assembly; the old building had burned in 1880. In 1881, he was named Queen's Counsel.

Political career
Landry was elected to the House of Commons in an 1883 by-election after Gilbert-Anselme Girouard accepted the position of customs collector. In 1890, he was named judge in the county court of Westmorland and Kent and, in 1893, was appointed to the Supreme Court of New Brunswick. Landry was knighted in June 1916, the first and only Acadian to be so honoured. He died in Dorchester later that year at the age of 70.

Electoral record

References
 
 

1846 births
1916 deaths
Acadian people
Canadian Knights Bachelor
Conservative Party of Canada (1867–1942) MPs
Judges in New Brunswick
Members of the House of Commons of Canada from New Brunswick
Members of the Executive Council of New Brunswick
Persons of National Historic Significance (Canada)
Progressive Conservative Party of New Brunswick MLAs
Canadian King's Counsel
Provincial Secretaries of New Brunswick